The Idaho Falls Idaho Temple (formerly the Idaho Falls Temple) is the tenth constructed and eighth operating temple of the Church of Jesus Christ of Latter-day Saints.  Located in the city of Idaho Falls, Idaho, it was the church's first temple built in Idaho, and the first built with a modern single-spire design.

History
The temple in Idaho Falls was announced on March 3, 1937. The building was designed by the church board of temple architects: Edward O. Anderson, Georgious Y. Cannon, Ramm Hansen, John Fetzer, Hyrum Pope, Lorenzo Snow Young. The exterior of the temple was completed in September 1941 and the interior was expected to be completed the following year. However, with World War II shortages, it delayed the completion of the temple for four more years. In spite of delays, church president George Albert Smith dedicated the Idaho Falls Temple just one month after the war ended, on September 23, 1945.

In 1983 the temple was the first to receive an angel Moroni statue after its original dedication.

The name of the temple was changed from the Idaho Falls Temple to the Idaho Falls Idaho Temple in 1999 when the church introduced standardized naming conventions for temples worldwide.

In March 2015, the temple closed for renovations that were expected to last 18 months.  The renovations took nearly two years and following their completion, a public open house was held from April 22 through May 20, 2017. The temple was rededicated by Henry B. Eyring on June 4, 2017.  The evening prior to the rededication, a youth cultural celebration, outlining the church and temple's history in the region and titled "Temple by the River Reflections" was held June 3, 2017 at Holt Arena. Approximately 11,000 youth participated in the event, which took a year of planning. The 70-minute program included costumes made with 27 miles of cloth.

Temple president
A notable president of the temple is John H. Groberg (2005–08). Groberg's parents, Delbert V. and Jennie Groberg, also served as president and matron of the temple from 1975-1980.

See also

 Comparison of temples of The Church of Jesus Christ of Latter-day Saints
 List of temples of The Church of Jesus Christ of Latter-day Saints
 List of temples of The Church of Jesus Christ of Latter-day Saints by geographic region
 Temple architecture (Latter-day Saints)
 The Church of Jesus Christ of Latter-day Saints in Idaho

References

External links

 
 Idaho Falls Idaho Temple Official site
 Idaho Falls Idaho Temple at ChurchofJesusChristTemples.org

20th-century Latter Day Saint temples
Buildings and structures in Idaho Falls, Idaho
Temples (LDS Church) in Idaho
1945 establishments in Idaho
Religious buildings and structures completed in 1945